Sonia Adesara (born 1990) is a British medical doctor and activist who specialises in reproductive health. She is campaigner for migrants rights and gender equality. She co-chairs the Young Medical Women International Association, and sits on the Central Council of the Socialist Health Association.

Early life and education 
Adesara is the daughter of an Asian-Ugandan refugee. She studied medicine at the University of Nottingham.

Career 
Adesara is a medical doctor. She is co-Chair of the Young Medical Women International Association, and a National Medical Director's Clinical Fellow at Macmillan. She was a member of the Keep Our NHS Public campaign in July 2019. She has written about the rise in anti-abortion rhetoric in light of the Brexit vote and election of Donald Trump. Adesara is a member of the 50:50 Parliament campaign, which looks to increase women's representation in the Palace of Westminster. She has previously chaired the Young Fabians Health Network.

Throughout the COVID-19 pandemic, Adesara worked as a doctor in central London. She used social media to communicate public health advice as well as sharing her concerns about the deteriorating conditions in hospitals.

Awards and honours
She was featured in the Stylist magazine as a Woman of the Week in 2018 and selected as a Marie Claire Future Shaper in 2019. In 2019 she was awarded the Asian Women of Achievement Young Achiever award.

References 

1990 births
Living people
British women medical doctors